Jogentagana (Latin: Jogentagania) was a small landlocked ancient Estonian county in the eastern part of the territory of Estonia. It was conquered by the Teutonic Order in the Estonian Crusade and became part of the Livonian Order.

Settlements
 Igeteveri
 Kavastu
 Kärkna
 Maarja-Magdaleena
 Äksi

See also 
Livonian Crusade

References

External links 
Kuidas elasid inimesed vanasti, möödunud sajandil ja praegu (Estonian) 
9. - 13. saj.pärinevad Eesti aardeleiud (Estonian)
Eesti haldusjaotus ja võõrvõimude vaheldumine läbi aegade (Estonian)

Ancient counties of Estonia